Hollandaise sauce ( or), also called Dutch sauce, is a mixture of egg yolk, melted butter, and lemon juice (or a white wine or vinegar reduction). It is usually seasoned with salt, and either white pepper or cayenne pepper.

It is well known as a key ingredient of eggs Benedict, and is often served on vegetables such as steamed asparagus.

Origins

Sauce hollandaise is French for "Hollandic sauce". The name implies Dutch origins, but the actual connection is unclear. The name "Dutch sauce" is documented in English as early as 1573, though without a recipe showing that it was the same thing. The first documented recipe is from 1651 in La Varenne's Le Cuisinier François for "asparagus with fragrant sauce":

 Not much later, in 1667, a similar Dutch recipe was published. There is a popular theory that the name comes from a recipe that the French Huguenots brought back from their exile in Holland.

La Varenne is credited with bringing sauces out of the Middle Ages with his publication and may well have invented hollandaise sauce. A more recent name for it is sauce Isigny, named after Isigny-sur-Mer, which is famous for its butter. Isigny sauce is found in recipe books starting in the 19th century.

By the 19th century, sauces had been classified into four categories by Carême. One of his categories was allemande, which was a stock-based sauce using egg and lemon juice. Escoffier replaced allemande with egg based emulsions, including hollandaise and mayonnaise  in his list of the five mother sauces of haute cuisine. While many believe that a true hollandaise sauce should only contain the basic ingredients of eggs, butter, and lemon, Prosper Montagne suggested using either a white wine or vinegar reduction, similar to a Béarnaise sauce, to help improve the taste.

In English, the name "Dutch sauce" was common through the 19th century, but was largely displaced by hollandaise in the 20th.

Preparation and handling

As in other egg emulsion sauces, like mayonnaise and Béarnaise, the egg does not coagulate as in a custard; rather, the lecithin in the eggs serves as an emulsifier, allowing the mixture of the normally immiscible butter and lemon juice to form a stable emulsion.

To make hollandaise sauce, beaten egg yolks are combined with butter, lemon juice, salt, and water, and heated gently while being mixed. Some cooks use a double boiler to control the temperature. Some recipes add melted butter to warmed yolks; others call for unmelted butter and the yolks to be heated together; still others combine warm butter and eggs in a blender or food processor. Temperature control is critical, as excessive temperature can curdle the sauce. Some chefs start with a reduction. The reduction consists of vinegar, water and cracked peppercorns. These ingredients are reduced to "au sec" or almost dry, strained, and added to the egg yolk mixture.

Hollandaise can be frozen.

Derivatives 

Mayonnaise and its derivative Hollandaise are among the French mother sauces, and the foundation for many derivatives created by adding or changing ingredients, including:

The most common derivative is sauce Béarnaise.  It can be produced by replacing the acidifying agent (vinegar reduction or lemon juice) in a preparation with a strained reduction of vinegar, shallots, fresh chervil, fresh tarragon, and (if to taste) crushed peppercorns. Alternatively, the flavorings may be added to a standard hollandaise. Béarnaise and its children are often used on steak or other "assertive" grilled meats and fish.
Sauce Choron is a variation of Béarnaise without tarragon or chervil, plus tomato purée.
Sauce Foyot (or Valois) is Béarnaise with meat glaze.
Sauce Colbert is sauce Foyot with reduced white wine.
Sauce Paloise is Béarnaise with mint substituted for tarragon.
Sauce au vin blanc (for fish) is hollandaise with a reduction of white wine and fish stock.
Sauce Bavaroise is hollandaise with cream, horseradish, and thyme.
Sauce crème fleurette is hollandaise with crème fraîche.
Sauce Dijon, also known as sauce moutarde or sauce Girondine, is hollandaise with Dijon mustard.
Sauce Maltaise is hollandaise with blanched orange zest and the juice of blood orange.
Sauce Mousseline, also known as sauce Chantilly, is hollandaise with whipped cream folded in.
Sauce divine is sauce Mousseline with reduced sherry in the whipped cream.
Madame Benoît's recipe for Mousseline uses whipped egg whites instead of whipped cream.
Sauce noisette is hollandaise made with browned butter.

Notes

Citations

References

External links

Mrs. Beeton, The book of household Management, 1861: Project Gutenberg e-text
History of Sauces
History of Hollandaise

 How To Make Hollandaise Sauce Step-by-step tutorial from About.com (generally good, but a glass or ceramic bowl is not recommended as they make it too difficult to control the heat)
 Free Culinary School Podcast Episode 8 A podcast (audio) episode that talks about the proper classical technique for making Hollandaise and the science behind the method.
 Ina Garten's Blender Hollandaise

French sauces
Egg-based sauces